The 1986 Amílcar Cabral Cup was held in Dakar, Senegal.

Group stage

Group A

Group B

Knockout stage

Semi-finals

Final

References
RSSSF archives

Amílcar Cabral Cup